Narrow Water Castle (Ulster-Scots: Narra Wattèr Castle) is a 16th-century tower house and bawn near Warrenpoint in Northern Ireland. It is beside the A2 road and on the County Down bank of the Clanrye (Newry) River, which enters Carlingford Lough a mile to the south. It is a historic monument in state care in the townland of Narrow Water, in Newry and Mourne District Council district, at grid ref: J1256 1939.

History

Originally the site of a 13th century Norman keep (associated with Hugh de Lacy), a replacement tower house and bawn was built at Narrow Water (by the Magennis family) in the 16th century. The replacement structure, built in the 1560s, was a typical example of the tower houses built throughout Ireland at the time. This kind of building, often rectangular in plan and three or more storeys high, comprised a series of superimposed chambers, with stairs, closets and latrines built within the walls (which are 1.5 metres or five feet thick in places).

The castle was damaged during the Irish Rebellion of 1641, and sold to the Hall family in the 1670s. It was occupied by the Hall family until they built an "Elizabethan revival style" mansion (also called "Narrow Water Castle") in the early 19th century.

The original (16th century) Narrow Water Castle keep was given into state care in 1956. The more recent (19th century) mansion remains a private residence of the Hall family.

On 27 August 1979, 18 British Army soldiers were killed by a Provisional IRA ambush near Narrow Water Castle (see Narrow Water ambush). It was the greatest single loss of life for the British Army during The Troubles.

A bridge was proposed to be built near the castle in the early 21st century. However, in July 2013, Louth County Council announced that the projected costs were prohibitive and the project was not progressed.

See also 
List of castles in Northern Ireland

References

External links 

Narrow Water Castle Official Site

Castles in County Down
Tower houses in Northern Ireland